Avihu Medina (born August 19, 1948 in Tel Aviv) is an Israeli composer, arranger, songwriter, and singer of Mediterranean Israeli music.

Medina was born in Tel Aviv. He was the third son of Aaron and Leah Medina. His mother's family immigrated from Yemen in 1906 and she was born in Jerusalem, and his father immigrated from Yemen in 1939 when it was under the British Mandate.  He is Jewish, and his father was a cantor.

As a teenager he lived on Kibbutz Kissufim. He served as a tank commander in the Israel Defense Forces. In the 1980s he established a diamond polishing business.

Avihu is a resident of Petah Tikva.

Music career
Avihu has composed more than 401 Mizrachi music songs.  Through 2007, he had released nine albums.  He is considered by some to be the best-known Oriental singer, and has composed many of Zohar Argov's songs.

References

External links
Official website

1948 births
Living people
20th-century Israeli male singers
Israeli people of Yemeni-Jewish descent
Israeli pop singers
Jewish singers
People from Tel Aviv
Israeli male singer-songwriters